Otavi Constituency is an electoral constituency in the Otjozondjupa Region of Namibia. It had 11,620 inhabitants in 2004 and 9,608 registered voters . The constituency consists of the town of Otavi and the surrounding rural area.

Politics
The 2015 regional election was won by Laina Mekundi of the SWAPO Party with 1,982 votes, followed by Fred Grundeling of the Democratic Turnhalle Alliance (DTA) with 325 votes and Bella Hunibes of the All People’s Party (APP) with 191 votes. The SWAPO candidate also won the 2020 regional election. George Garab received 1,567 votes; The independent candidate Johannes Johannes came second with 769 votes.

References

Constituencies of Otjozondjupa Region
States and territories established in 1992
1992 establishments in Namibia